Massimo Terzano (23 April 1892 – 18 October 1947) was an Italian cinematographer. Terzano was a leading figure in the Italian film industry, working on over eighty films during the silent, Fascist and post-war eras. His final film was The Barber of Seville, made shortly before his death.

Selected filmography
 Emperor Maciste (1924)
 Saetta Learns to Live (1924)
 Maciste in the Lion's Cage (1926)
 The Giant of the Dolomites (1927)
 The Carnival of Venice (1928)
 Judith and Holofernes (1929)
 The Song of Love (1930)
 When Naples Sings (1930)
 Figaro and His Great Day (1931) 
 Lowered Sails (1931)
 Before the Jury (1931)
 Courtyard (1931)
 The Private Secretary (1931)
 What Scoundrels Men Are! (1932)
 The Opera Singer (1932)
 Steel (1933)
 Giallo (1933)
 Fanny (1933)
 Ragazzo (1934)
 Stadium (1934)
 Casta Diva (1935)
 Aldebaran (1935)
 Like the Leaves (1935)
 Those Two (1935)
 The White Squadron (1936)
 But It's Nothing Serious (1936)
 Joe the Red (1936)
 The Great Appeal (1936)
 The Anonymous Roylott (1936)
 The Carnival Is Here Again (1937)
 Mother Song (1937)
I've Lost My Husband! (1937)
 Doctor Antonio (1937)
 Princess Tarakanova (1938)
 Giuseppe Verdi (1938)
 The Sons of the Marquis Lucera (1939)
 The Silent Partner (1939)
 Our Miss Doctor (1940)
 Boccaccio (1940)
 Captain Tempest (1942)
 Tragic Night (1942)
 The Lion of Damascus (1942)
 Malombra (1942)
 A Pistol Shot (1942)
  (1944)
 Two Anonymous Letters (1945)
 Days of Glory (1945)
 The Barber of Seville (1947)
 Crime News (1947)

References

Bibliography
 Moliterno, Gino. The A to Z of Italian Cinema. Scarecrow Press, 2009.

External links

1892 births
1947 deaths
Italian cinematographers
Film people from Turin